Højskolesangbogen of the Danish adult Folk High Schools is a songbook established by Heinrich von Nutzhorn, with a first edition in 1894, and a substantial revised standard edition in 1922.

12 of the songs were selected as part of the Danish Culture Canon (see article for listing). These 12 songs were freshly recorded under the auspices of Det Kongelige Bibliotek in 2006 by Signe Asmussen, soprano, David Danholt, tenor, and pianist Ulrich Stærk, and released as Fra Højskolesangbogen on the government-funded Dacapo Records label.

References

Song books
1894 books